Sir John Bernard (23 August 1604 – 5 March 1674) of Abington Park, Northamptonshire was an English landowner and briefly a Member of Parliament.

Biography
The eldest son of Baldwin Bernard of Abington, Northamptonshire, he succeeded his father in 1610.

He was knighted on 24 September 1661, and on 31 March 1664 he was elected Member of Parliament for Northampton, but was unseated on 26 April in favour of Sir Henry Yelverton.

In 1669 he sold Abington Park, having previously extended it, to William Thursby, a future MP for Northampton. He died in 1674.

He had married firstly Elizabeth, daughter of Sir Clement Edmondes; they had four sons, who all predeceased him, and four daughters. His second wife, Elizabeth, was daughter of John and Susanna Hall and granddaughter (and only surviving descendant) of William Shakespeare. They had no children.

References

1604 births
1674 deaths
People from Abington, Northamptonshire
Alumni of King's College, Cambridge
Members of Gray's Inn
Knights Bachelor
English MPs 1661–1679